Gyalmya (also, Gyal’mya, Gal’mya, and Gyal’ma) is a village in the Aghjabadi Rayon of Azerbaijan.

References 

Populated places in Aghjabadi District